Chaoyang Park station is a station on Line 14 of the Beijing Subway. It is located near Chaoyang Park in Chaoyang District. It opened on 31 December 2016.

The under construction Line 3 will also stop at this station.

Station layout 
The station has an underground island platform, with a reserved gateway in the centre for future interchange.

Exits 
There are 4 exits, lettered A, B, D1, and D2. Exit D2 is accessible.

References

Beijing Subway stations in Chaoyang District
Railway stations in China opened in 2016